Gnaeus Papirius Carbo was Roman consul in 113 BC, together with Gaius Caecilius Metellus Caprarius.

Life 
He was according to Cicero (ad Fam. ix. 21) the father of the Carbo of the same name, who was thrice consul, whereas this latter is called by Velleius Paterculus (II 26) a brother of Gaius Papirius Carbo Arvina. This difficulty may be solved by supposing that the word frater in Velleius is equivalent to frater patruelis or cousin. (Perizon., Animadv. Hist. p. 96.) 

During his consulship, he was ordered by the Senate to take legions to defend the Alps from the migration of the Cimbri. There, he shadowed the Germanic tribe and ambushed them near Noreia. At the ensuing Battle of Noreia, although Carbo held the advantage in terrain and surprise, his forces were overwhelmed by the sheer magnitude of Cimbrian warriors, and disastrously defeated. The Cimbri, while smashing the Roman army, did not advance into Italy, seemingly looking for some place to settle. 

He was afterwards accused by Marcus Antonius for provoking and then losing the Battle of Noreia. Securing a conviction, Carbo committed suicide rather than depart for exile, taking a solution of vitriol (atramentum sutorium, Cic., ad Fam. IX 21; Liv., Epit. 63.).

Sources 
  Details a broad narrative history of history from the death of the Gracchi brothers to the dictatorship of Sulla.

References

2nd-century BC Roman consuls
2nd-century BC Roman generals
Ancient Romans who committed suicide
Carbo, Gnaeus 641
People of the Cimbrian War